Spodnja Branica is a village in western Slovenia in the Municipality of Nova Gorica. It is located southeast of Branik (formerly known as Rihemberk), just below the Karst Plateau.

References

External links

Spodnja Branica on Geopedia

Populated places in the City Municipality of Nova Gorica